Hypidalia is a genus of moths in the family Erebidae erected by George Hampson in 1901.

Species
Hypidalia enervis
Hypidalia luteoalba
Hypidalia sanguirena

References

External links

Phaegopterina
Moth genera